Following is a list of all Article III United States federal judges appointed by President George W. Bush during his presidency, including a partial list of Judges appointed under Article I.

In total Bush appointed 327 Article III federal judges, including 2 Justices to the Supreme Court of the United States (including one Chief Justice), 62 judges to the United States Courts of Appeals, 261 judges to the United States district courts and 2 judges to the United States Court of International Trade. Additionally, he made appointments to various courts established under Article I and Article IV.

United States Supreme Court justices

Courts of appeals

District courts

United States Court of International Trade

Specialty courts (Article I)

United States Court of Federal Claims

United States Court of Appeals for Veterans Claims

United States Court of Appeals for the Armed Forces

United States Tax Court

Territorial courts (Article IV)

Notes

Courts

Renominations

References
General

 
 
 

Specific

Sources
 Federal Judicial Center

Bush

Presidency of George W. Bush
George W. Bush-related lists